Cheat Lake is a  reservoir on the Cheat River in Monongalia County, West Virginia, United States. It was originally named Lake Lynn, but the Board on Geographic Names officially decided upon Cheat Lake as the reservoir's name in 1976.

Cheat Lake has 3 marinas located towards the river end of the reservoir. They are Edgewater Marina, Cheat Lake Marina, and Sunset Beach Marina.

Cheat Lake Dam is located directly south of the Mason–Dixon line border with Pennsylvania. The first water flowed over the dam on December 23, 1925 and it began its operation on May 31, 1926.

See also

Mont Chateau State Park, a former state park (1955–1977) along Cheat Lake
Coopers Rock State Forest
Snake Hill Wildlife Management Area

References

External links
CheatLake.com  Informational website about Cheat Lake and surrounding area. Provides a map of the lake and details about the marinas & restaurants.  

Energy infrastructure completed in 1925
Bodies of water of Monongalia County, West Virginia
Reservoirs in West Virginia
Hydroelectric power plants in West Virginia
Historic American Engineering Record in West Virginia